The 2008 World Touring Car Championship season was the fifth World Touring Car Championship season, the fourth since its 2005 return. It began on 2 March, and ended on 16 November, after twenty-four races. The championship, which was open to Super 2000 Cars and Diesel 2000 Cars, was composed of the FIA World Touring Car Championship for Drivers and the FIA World Touring Car Championship for Manufacturers.

Frenchman Yvan Muller won the Drivers title by 26 points from SEAT team-mate Gabriele Tarquini, with Chevrolet's Robert Huff finishing third just a point behind Tarquini. The Manufacturers Championship was awarded to SEAT.

Teams and drivers

The full season entry list.

Note: Macau-based RPM Racing Team had planned to race one Toyota Altezza and one Honda Civic Type-R for Macanese drivers Lei Kit Meng and Jo Rosa Merszei in the final races in Macau. Although car numbers were allocated to them (#64 for Meng (Toyota Altezza) and #65 for Merszei (Honda Civic)), the FIA Touring Car Bureau rejected the entries because neither of these cars had been homologated by the FIA.

Driver changes
Changed Teams
 Olivier Tielemans: N-Technology → Wiechers-Sport
 Tom Coronel: GR Asia → SUNRED Engineering
 Stefano D'Aste: Wiechers-Sport → Scuderia Proteam Motorsport

Entering WTCC including those who entered one-off rounds in 2007
 Rickard Rydell: No full-time drive → SEAT Sport
 Ibrahim Okyay: Turkish Touring Car Championship → Borusan Otomotiv Motorsport
 Viktor Shapovalov: Dutch Supercar Challenge → Russian Bears Motorsport
 Jaap van Lagen: Porsche Supercup → Russian Bears Motorsport
 Franz Engstler: Asian Touring Car Series → Liqui Moly Team Engstler
 Andrey Romanov: Asian Touring Car Series → Liqui Moly Team Engstler

Leaving WTCC
 Michel Jourdain Jr.: SEAT Sport → No full-time drive
 Roberto Colciago: SEAT Sport Italia → Italian Endurance Touring Championship
 Emmet O'Brien: GR Asia → Danish Touring Car Championship
 Maurizio Ceresoli: GR Asia → No full-time drive
 Luca Rangoni: Scuderia Proteam Motorsport → Porsche Carrera Cup Italy
 Miguel Freitas: Racing for Belgium → SEAT León Supercopa Spain

Calendar
A provisional calendar was released in November, 2007.

Sweden was to be included in the calendar for 21 September but the FIA confirmed on 3 May 2008 that the Swedish round at the Scandinavian Raceway was replaced by an Italy round at the revamped Imola Circuit.

Results and standings

Races

Standings

Drivers' Championship
The final standings in the 2008 FIA World Touring Car Championship for Drivers were :

† — Drivers did not finish the race, but were classified as they completed over 90% of the race distance.

Drivers' Championship points were awarded on a 10–8–6–5–4–3–2–1 basis to the first eight finishers in each race.

Manufacturers' Championship

Manufacturers' Championship points were awarded on a 10–8–6–5–4–3–2–1 basis to the first eight finishers in each race. However, only the results of the best two cars for each manufacturer were taken into account.

Yokohama Independents' Trophy

The Yokohama Independents' Trophy uses a similar system to the Drivers’ Championship, however double points are awarded at Macau.

Yokohama Teams' Trophy

All the teams taking part in any of the rounds of the 2008 FIA World Touring Car Championship were eligible to
score points for the Yokohama Teams' Trophy. Points were awarded to the two best classified cars of each team, providing they were driven by Independent drivers. All other cars of that same team were considered invisible as far as scoring points was concerned.

References

External links
 FIA World Touring Car Championship official website: Archives
 2008 Entry list
 2008 Race results
 2008 Championship point standings
 2008 Independents' Trophies point standings
 2008 WTCC race results Retrieved from www.teamdan.com on 1 January 2008